Katrina Rore (née Grant; born 6 May 1987 in Papakura, Auckland, New Zealand) is a New Zealand international netball player. Rore is the current vice-captain of the New Zealand national netball team, the Silver Ferns, and plays for the Central Pulse in the ANZ Championship. Rore signed to the New South Wales swifts in the suncorp super netball league in the latter half of the 2018–2019 season following the netball World Cup.

In domestic netball, Rore previously played for the Canterbury Flames in the National Bank Cup in 2005, before moving south for a two-year stint with the Otago Rebels (2006–07). In the ANZ Championship, she played for the Southern Steel in 2008 and 2009, before signing with the Wellington-based Central Pulse for 2010.

Rore was included in the Silver Ferns team for 2008. She made her on-court debut the same year against Australia, partnering Casey Williams in the defence circle. She also played with the Silver Ferns at the 2009 World Netball Series in Manchester and the 2010 Commonwealth Games in Delhi, with New Zealand winning gold medals at both events.  Rore was selected as the 26th captain of the Silver Ferns in 2017, however her leadership fell under criticism when the team did not win a medal at the 2018 Commonwealth Games. Rore failed to make the Silver Ferns selection under Noeline Taurua coaching for the 2019 Netball Quad Series she was however re-selected for the 2019 Netball World Cup.

Rore was named the 2018 ANZ Premiership Player of the Year.

December 2022 Rore announced her official retirement from international netball, Rore was only one of four Silver Ferns to become a centurion with 137 caps to her name behind  Irene van Dyk  Maria Folau and Laura Langman.

Personal life
Katrina Rore is married to Joel Rore, to whom she proposed in Fiji. Rore missed the 2021 season due to pregnancy, and gave birth to the couple's first child, in May that year. Rore planned to make her domestic comeback in 2022 with the Waikato Bay of Plenty Magic, but this did not eventuate after she announced her second pregnancy.

References

External links
2018 Silver Ferns profile

1987 births
Living people
New Zealand netball players
Central Pulse players
Southern Steel players
New Zealand international netball players
Commonwealth Games gold medallists for New Zealand
Netball players at the 2010 Commonwealth Games
Netball players from Auckland
ANZ Championship players
People from Papakura
Netball players at the 2014 Commonwealth Games
Commonwealth Games silver medallists for New Zealand
Commonwealth Games medallists in netball
Netball players at the 2018 Commonwealth Games
University of Otago alumni
2019 Netball World Cup players
ANZ Premiership players
New South Wales Swifts players
New Zealand expatriate netball people in Australia
2011 World Netball Championships players
2015 Netball World Cup players
Otago Rebels players
Canterbury Flames players
New Zealand international Fast5 players
Waikato Bay of Plenty Magic players
Medallists at the 2010 Commonwealth Games
Medallists at the 2014 Commonwealth Games